Richard Lyon Geaves (6 May 1854 – 21 March 1935) was a footballer who made one appearance for England in an international against Scotland, playing as England's outside left on 6 March 1875.

He was born in Mexico, attended Harrow School and Gonville and Caius College, Cambridge, played for Clapham Rovers and Old Harrovians, joined the 14th Prince of Wales Yorkshire Regiment and became their captain six years later before he left them in 1881. He was the first Mexico-born player to represent England.

See also
 List of England international footballers born outside England

References

External links

1854 births
1935 deaths
Footballers from Mexico City
English footballers
England international footballers
Mexican footballers
Mexican people of English descent
Alumni of Gonville and Caius College, Cambridge
People educated at Harrow School
Clapham Rovers F.C. players
Old Harrovians F.C. players
Association football outside forwards
Yorkshire Regiment officers